The California Style Manual, as provided by order of the California Supreme Court and pursuant to statute, is "the official organ for the styles to be used in the publication of the Official Reports" of decisions by California's courts. A person filing a document in a California state court may use either the style for legal citations prescribed in the Manual or the very different system promulgated in The Bluebook: A Uniform System of Citation, but must use the same style consistently throughout the document. Most California state courts, and lawyers practicing in those courts, use the Manuals citation style. The current (fourth) edition of the Manual, published in 2000 by West Group, is freely available online at the Sixth District Appellate Program webpage.

History

The California Style Manual was first published in 1942 by Bernard E. Witkin, who was the California Reporter of Decisions from 1940 to 1949. Originally intended primarily for court staff and the Reporter of Decisions themselves, the Manual soon became popular amongst attorneys. The second edition was written by William Nankervis in 1961, who served as Reporter from 1949 to 1969; the second revised and third editions were written by Robert E. Formichi in 1976 and 1986, respectively, during his term as Reporter from 1969 to 1989.

The fourth and latest edition was published in 2000 by Edward W. Jessen, who served as Reporter from 1989 to 2014. The fifth edition will be written by Lawrence W. Striley, the current reporter of decisions since 2014, and will be published by LexisNexis under contract with the Supreme Court.

References

California_law
Bibliography
Legal citation guides